Kilrenny in Fife was a royal burgh that returned one commissioner to the Parliament of Scotland and to the Convention of Estates.

After the Acts of Union 1707, Kilrenny, Anstruther Easter, Anstruther Wester, Crail and Pittenweem formed the Anstruther Easter district of burghs, returning one member between them to the House of Commons of Great Britain.

List of burgh commissioners

 1669–72: Captain Gideon Murray, merchant-burgess  
 1672: Kilrenny renounced rights to representation but later allowed to continue
 1689 convention, 1689–93: George Bethune (or Beaton), trader (expelled 1693 for absence after refusing oath of allegiance) 
 1693–1701: Alexander Stevenson  
 1702–07: James Bethune the younger of Balfour

See also
 List of constituencies in the Parliament of Scotland at the time of the Union

References

Constituencies of the Parliament of Scotland (to 1707)
Politics of Fife
History of Fife
Constituencies disestablished in 1707
1707 disestablishments in Scotland